The Trad class was a class of nine torpedo boats built for the Royal Thai Navy in the 1930s by the Italian shipbuilder Cantieri Riuniti dell'Adriatico. They entered service between 1935 and 1938. Two of the ships were sunk (and a third badly damaged by French warships at the Battle of Ko Chang in 1941, but the remaining seven ships had long careers, remaining in service until the 1970s.

Construction and design
In 1934, the Royal Thai Navy launched a major re-equipment programme, with orders split between Italy and Japan.

The Italian design resembled a smaller version of the  torpedo boats building for the Italian Navy. Displacement was  standard and  full load. Two Yarrow boilers supplied steam for two sets of Parsons geared steam turbines, which drove two propeller shafts.

The ship's main armament was supplied by Vickers-Armstrongs, to be compatible with existing British-built ships in the Thai Navy. Three  anti-aircraft guns were carried, backed up by a close-in armament of two  cannon and four machine guns. Six  torpedo tubes were fitted, with two twin mounts on the ships' centerlines and two single tubes mounted forward at the break of the forecastle. Crew was 70 officers and other ranks. By 1971, the surviving ships' armament had been revised, with one of the 76 mm guns and the two single torpedo tubes removed from all of the class, and one of the twin torpedo tube mounts removed from  Trad, Phuket and Chumporn. This allowed the addition of one or two  Bofors guns.

The ships were built at CRDA's Monfalcone shipyard, with the first two launched in 1935, with four more following in 1936 and the remaining three in 1937.

Service
The first two ships ( and )  arrived in Bangkok on 19 April 1936, with the next two (Pattani and Surasdra) reaching Thailand by the end of the year, and the remaining five commissioning in Italy in March 1937. In January 1941, Thailand attacked French Indochina in the Franco-Thai War. Thonburi, Cholburi and Songkla were sunk, while Trad was badly damaged. The remaining ships stayed in service until the 1970s, with the last ship retiring in 1977.

Ships
Note: Construction and delivery dates vary between sources.

Notes

Citations

References
 
 
 
 
 
 
 

Torpedo boats of Thailand
Ships built by Cantieri Riuniti dell'Adriatico
Torpedo boat classes